Notoclinus is a genus of triplefins in the family Tripterygiidae.

Species
 Brown topknot, Notoclinus compressus (Hutton, 1872)
 New Zealand topknot, Notoclinus fenestratus (Forster, 1801)

References
 

 
Tripterygiidae